William Todd Field (born February 24, 1964) is an American actor and filmmaker. He is known for directing In the Bedroom (2001), Little Children (2006), and Tár (2022), films nominated for a combined fourteen Academy Awards. Field has personally received six Academy Award nominations for his films, two for Best Picture, two for Best Adapted Screenplay, one for Best Director, and one for Best Original Screenplay.

Early life
Field was born in Pomona, California, where his family ran a poultry farm. When Field turned two, his family moved to Portland, Oregon, where his father went to work as a salesman, and his mother became a school librarian. At an early age, he became interested in performing sleight-of-hand and later music.

As a child in Portland, Field was a batboy for the Portland Mavericks, a single A independent minor league baseball team owned by Hollywood actor Bing Russell. Kurt Russell, Bing's son and later an actor in his own right, also played for the Portland Mavericks during this time. Field and Mavericks pitching coach Rob Nelson created the first batch of Big League Chew in the Field family kitchen. In 1980, Nelson and former New York Yankees all-star Jim Bouton sold the idea to the Wrigley Company. Since that time over 800 million pouches have been sold worldwide.

Education
A budding jazz musician, at the age of sixteen Field became a member of the Big Band at Mount Hood Community College in Gresham, Oregon. Headed by Larry McVey, the band had become a proving-ground and regular stop for Stan Kenton and Mel Tormé when they were looking for new players. It was here Field played trombone along with his friend, trumpeter and future Grammy Award Winner Chris Botti. During this same time he also worked as a non-union projectionist at a second-run movie theater. Field graduated with his class from Centennial High School on Portland's east side and briefly attended Southern Oregon State College (now Southern Oregon University) in Ashland on a music scholarship, but left after his freshman year favoring a move to New York to study acting with Robert X. Modica at his renowned Carnegie Hall Studio. Soon after, Field began performing with the Ark Theatre Company as both an actor and musician. He received his Master of Fine Arts from the AFI Conservatory.

Career
Field has worked in varying capacities as an actor, director, producer, composer, screenwriter, and editor. Field began making motion pictures after Woody Allen cast him in Radio Days (1987). He went on to work with some of America's greatest filmmakers, including Stanley Kubrick, Victor Nuñez, Lloyd Kaufman and Carl Franklin. During the 1990s, Todd Field worked as the primary film editor for Troma Entertainment, editing films like Tromeo and Juliet.

Franklin and Nuñez, both AFI alumni, encouraged Field to enroll as a Directing Fellow at the AFI, which he did in 1992. He has received the Satyajit Ray Award from the British Film Institute, and a Jury Prize from the Sundance Film Festival. His short films have been exhibited at various venues overseas and domestically at the Museum of Modern Art.

In the Bedroom 

Field wrote and directed In the Bedroom, a film based on Andre Dubus's short story "Killings". (Kubrick and Dubus were among Field's mentors; both died right before the production of In the Bedroom.) In the Bedroom was nominated for five Academy Awards including Best Picture, Best Actor (Tom Wilkinson, his first nomination), Best Actress (Sissy Spacek, her sixth), Supporting Actress (Marisa Tomei, her second), and Best Adapted Screenplay. The film was shot in Rockland, Maine, a New England town where Field resides. The house where he, his wife (Serena Rathbun), and their four children live was even used as the setting for one sequence. Rathbun and Spacek did some of the set design and Field handled the camera himself on many of the shots.

In the Bedroom made its debut at the 2001 Sundance Film Festival. Dennis Lim wrote in the Village Voice:

Upon the film's release David Ansen of Newsweek wrote:

Anthony Quinn of The Independent stated,

For his work on In the Bedroom, Field was named Director of the Year by the National Board of Review, and his script was awarded Best Original Screenplay. The film was named Best Picture of the Year by the Los Angeles Film Critics Association, and the New York Film Critics Circle awarded Field Best First Film. In the Bedroom received six American Film Institute Awards, including Best Picture, Director, and Screenplay, three Golden Globe nominations, and five Academy Award nominations, including Best Picture, Actor, Actress, Supporting Actress, and two individually for Field as screenwriter and producer. The American Film Institute honored Field with the Franklin Schaffner Alumni Medal.

The February 2020 issue of New York Magazine lists In the Bedroom alongside Citizen Kane, Sunset Boulevard, Dr. Strangelove, Butch Cassidy and the Sundance Kid, The Conversation, Nashville, Taxi Driver, The Elephant Man, Pulp Fiction, There Will Be Blood, and Roma as "The Best Movies That Lost Best Picture at the Oscars."

Little Children 

Field followed In the Bedroom with Little Children, which was nominated for three Academy Awards, including two for the actors: Kate Winslet (her fifth nomination, and with it a record for the youngest actor to be nominated for five Academy Awards) and Jackie Earle Haley (his first nomination and first major role in over 15 years). After having written, directed and produced just two feature films, Field had garnered five Academy Award nominations for his actors and three for himself. The film, based on Tom Perrotta's novel of the same name, premiered at the 2006 New York Film Festival. In his roundup "Best of 2006", A.O. Scott of The New York Times wrote: 

International Cinephile Society's Matt Mazur called the film "subversive" and designed to disorient the viewer with "seemingly non-connected imagery to suggest a tone and a mood of disquiet." Mazur compared Field's technique with that of Sergei Eisenstein, D. W. Griffith, Georges Méliès, and Edwin S. Porter.

Many members of Field's creative team on In the Bedroom returned to work with him on the film, including Serena Rathbun. In a 2006 interview with The Hollywood Reporters Anne Thompson, Field said he quit acting and began making his own films after Rathbun told him, "Do what you want to do. Don't get distracted." Later that year, Field spoke extensively about the importance of Rathbun as his creative partner, describing a conversation he had with her where she gave him the most pivotal scene: "for me, the film is unthinkable without it."

 2006–2021: Unrealized projects 
After Little Children, Field went fifteen years without directing anything, which various film journalists lamented. In his 2015 Ioncinema piece "Top 10 American Indie Filmmakers Missing in Action", Nicholas Bell wrote, "It is definitely time for Field to throw one down the middle. In the meantime, we'll just have to watch In the Bedroom for the umpteenth time."

During that time, Field was attached to a number of film projects, including a film adaptation of the 2009 Boston Teran novel The Creed of Violence, set during the Mexican Revolution, which at different times was set to star Leonardo DiCaprio, Christian Bale and Daniel Craig; a coming-of-age Minor League Baseball story set in the 1970s Northwest; an adaptation of the 1985 Cormac McCarthy novel Blood Meridian; a political thriller called As It Happens, co-written by Joan Didion; an adaptation of Jess Walter's novel Beautiful Ruins; and a film about U.S. soldier Bowe Bergdahl.

In 2016, Field worked on a planned television adaptation of the 2015 Jonathan Franzen novel Purity, which was to be a 20-hour limited series for Showtime. The series was to be co-written by Field, Franzen and playwright David Hare. It would have starred Daniel Craig as Andreas Wolf and been executive produced by Field, Franzen, Craig, Hare and Scott Rudin. In 2016 Franzen said on The Diane Rehm Show that he was learning the art of adaptation from Field, whom he considered a "master" of the form. But in a February 2018 interview with The Times, Hare said that, given the budget for the adaptation ($170 million), he doubted it would ever be made. "It was one of the richest and most interesting six weeks of my life, sitting in a room with Todd Field, Jonathan Franzen and Daniel Craig bashing out the story. They're extremely interesting people", Hare added.

Speaking publicly for the first time in 16 years, Field told the New York Times in 2022, "I set my sights in a very particular way on certain material that was probably very tough to get made."

 Tár 

Field's third film, Tár, starring Cate Blanchett as the fictional conductor/composer Lydia Tár, premiered at the 79th Venice International Film Festival, where it competed for the Golden Lion and Queer Lion, with Blanchett winning the Volpi Cup for Best Actress. The film had a limited theatrical release in the United States on October 7, 2022, before its wide release on October 28, 2022, and International theatrical release that began first in the UK on 13 January 2023.

For his work on Tár, Field was nominated by the Directors' Guild of America for Best Director, the Producers Guild of America for Best Film, and the Writers Guild of America for Best Original Screenplay.

Tár  received five nominations from 76th British Academy Film Awards, including Best Picture, Best Director, Best Actress, Best Sound, and Best Screenplay of the Year, and six nominations for the  95th Academy Awards, including Best Picture, Best Director and Best Original Screenplay for Field, and Best Actress for Blanchett.

Tár was named Best Picture of the year by the London Film Critics' Circle with Field being named Best Director of the Year and Blanchett Best Actress. Field was named Best Director by The Los Angeles Film Critics Association, and his script Best Original Screenplay of the Year, as did the National Society of Film Critics.

Tár was selected Best Film of the Year by the New York Film Critics Circle, Los Angeles Film Critics Association, London Film Critics' Circle, and the National Society of Film Critics, becoming only the fourth film in history named as such from the world's top critics' groups. The previous films being Schindler's List, L. A. Confidential, and The Social Network, 
Tár was named "Best Picture of the Year" by Vanity Fair, The Atlantic, The Guardian, Daily Variety, The Hollywood Reporter, Screen Daily, Entertainment Weekly, and IndieWire's annual poll of 165 critics worldwide. The American Film Institute named it one of the top 10 films of the year.

Owen Gleiberman in his Venice Film Festival Daily Variety review wrote

A. O. Scott of The New York Times writing from the Telluride Film Festival and later from the New York Film Festival stated, 

Martin Scorsese presenting Best Film of the Year to Field at the 2022 New York Film Critics Circle Awards, praised Field's filmmaking saying,  "For so long now, so many of us see films that pretty much let us know where they're going... I mean, they take us by the hand and, even if it's disturbing at times, sort of comfort us along the way that it will be all okay by the end. Now this is insidious, as one can get lulled into this and ultimately get used to it, leading those of us who've experienced cinema in the past – as much more than that – to become despairing of the future of the art form, especially for younger generations. But that's on dark days. The clouds lifted when I experienced Todd's film, Tár. What you've done, Todd – is that the very fabric of the movie you created doesn't allow this. All the aspects of cinema and the film that you've used, attest to this. The shift in locations for example, the shift in locations alone do what cinema does best, which is to reduce space and time to what they are, which is nothing... all of this is conveyed through a masterful mise-en-scène, as controlled, precise, dangerous, precipitous angles and edges geometrically kind of chiseled into a wonderful 2:3:5 aspect ratio of frame compositions. The limits of the frame itself, and the provocation of measured long takes all reflecting the brutal architecture of her soul – Tár's soul."

Filmography
Actor

Filmmaker

 Accolades Directed Academy Award performances'

Field has directed multiple Oscar nominated performances.

References

External links

1964 births
American male screenwriters
Film producers from California
American male film actors
AFI Conservatory alumni
Living people
People from Pomona, California
Male actors from Portland, Oregon
People from Rockland, Maine
Southern Oregon University alumni
Film directors from California
Film directors from Oregon
Mt. Hood Community College alumni
Screenwriters from Oregon
Film directors from Maine
Screenwriters from California
Screenwriters from Maine
Film producers from Oregon